Tsatur Khan (1820–1905) was an Iranian general, envoy to Russia, and advisor to Shah Mozaffar ad-Din Qajar. He was a close friend of Grand Duke Michael Nikolaevich of Russia, and a member of the Davidkhanian family.

Biography 

Tsatur Khan, the son of Iranian diplomat and military advisor Set Khan and Lady Zizi Khanoom, was born in 1820 in Tabriz. He studied at the University of Cambridge. Because he was highly educated and his father had been a prominent government official and close friend of the Qajars, Tsatur was appointed as an Advisor to the young Crown Prince Mozaffar-ad-Din Qajar in Tabriz. Tsatur Khan settled in Tabriz with his wife, where he was served out his duties as a General in the Persian army, as well as taking on diplomatic responsibilities as the Chief Deputy of Iran in charge of meeting with foreign dignitaries. In this role, he visited England with Naser al-Din Shah Qajar, continuing his family's tradition of diplomacy. Notably, Mkrtich Khrimian asked for his assistance in protecting the Armenian community from Kurdish and Turkish attacks. Tsatur Khan was married to Ninon Hovnatanian, the daughter of Armenian painter Hakob Hovnatanyan.

Envoy to Russia 

Mikhail Nikolayevich, Grand Duke of the Caucasus, sent a pair of well-bred hunting dogs as a gift to Shah Mozaffar-al-Din Qajar. In return, the Prince decided to return the favor by sending the Grand Duke a pair of Arabian horses through a delegation headed by Tsatur Khan. The Duke was grateful for the horses, and impressed by Tsatur Khan’s sophistication. The Grand Duke asked how he had attained it, whereby Tsatur Khan told him of his education at Cambridge. The Duke then why Tsatur Khan had traveled so far to receive an education, as many members of the Iranian aristocracy were known to receive their education in Russia. Tsatur Khan responded to the Duke that it was because his father, Set Khan, had served as Ambassador to England. The Grand Duke announced that he would forgive Tsatur Khan on the condition that Tsatur promise the Duke that he would send his children to Russia to be educated, at the Duke’s expense. Tsatur Khan agreed, thus beginning his friendship with the Grand Duke and closer ties with Russia.

References 

Iranian diplomats
Iranian generals
Iranian military commanders
Qajar civil servants
Alumni of Trinity College, Cambridge
Persian Armenians
People from Tabriz
People educated at Eton College
1820 births
1905 deaths